Yamm is a rural locality (a village) in Gdovsky District of Pskov Oblast, Russia, located in the central portion of the district on the Zhelcha River. The population in 2010 was 848. From 1947 to 1958, the village was the administrative centre of Polnovsky District.

References

Rural localities in Pskov Oblast
Gdovsky Uyezd
Gdovsky District